Ricardo José Magalhães Barros (born 15 November 1959 in Maringá) is a Brazilian politician, civil engineer and businessman. He is a federal deputy and former mayor of Maringá. He is married to the Vice Governor of Paraná, Cida Borghetti. He is the son of the former mayor of Maringá Silvio Magalhães Barros and brother to the also former mayor Silvio Barros. In 2010, Barros was candidate for the Federal Senate, getting more than 2 million votes.

He is national vice-president of the Progressive Party (PP) and president of the National Council of Secretaries of Economic Development. In 2012, he was national coordinator of the city elections of PP, winning in his electoral domicile. He graduated as an Engineer at the State University of Maringá.

He was appointed on 12 May 2016 as Minister of Health by president Michel Temer, after the suspension of president Dilma Rousseff due to her impeachment process.

Gilberto Occhi, then president of Caixa Econômica Federal, succeed him as Minister, since Barros resigned to run for federal deputy at the 2018 general elections.

References

|-

|-

|-

1959 births
Living people
People from Maringá
Progressistas politicians
Members of the Chamber of Deputies (Brazil) from Paraná
Mayors of places in Brazil
Brazilian civil engineers
Brazilian businesspeople
Health ministers of Brazil